George Gerald Reisman (born January 13, 1937) is an American economist. He is Professor Emeritus of Economics at Pepperdine University and the author of The Government Against the Economy (1979), which was praised by both F. A. Hayek and Henry Hazlitt, and Capitalism: A Treatise on Economics (1996). He is known as an advocate of free market or laissez-faire capitalism.

Biography
Reisman was born in New York City and graduated from Columbia College in 1957. He earned his PhD from New York University under the direction of Ludwig von Mises, whose methodological work The Epistemological Problems of Economics Reisman translated from the German original to English.

In the 1980s, with his wife, psychologist Edith Packer, he organized the Jefferson School of Philosophy, Economics, and Psychology, which held several conferences and seminars, the first being held at University of California, San Diego. Its lecturers included Leonard Peikoff, Edward Teller, Petr Beckmann, Hans Sennholz, Bernard Siegan, Anne Wortham, Robert Hessen, Allan Gotthelf, David Kelley, John Ridpath, Harry Binswanger, Edwin Locke, Walter E. Williams, Mary Ann Sures, Andrew Bernstein and Peter Schwartz. Attendees of these conferences include later Objectivist writers Tara Smith and Lindsay Perigo.

Reisman was a student of Ayn Rand, whose influence on his thought and work he described as being as great as that of his mentor, Mises.

References

External links
 
 Reisman's website
 Reisman's Blog on Economics, Politics, Society, and Culture
 
 
 Why Nazism Was Socialism and Why Socialism Is Totalitarian
 Warum Nationalsozialismus Sozialismus war und warum Sozialismus totalitär ist

Works
 Government Against the Economy (1979)
 Capitalism: A Treatise on Economics (1996)
Archives
 Reisman archive at Mises.org
 Reisman archive at LewRockwell.com
 Reisman archive at Free Market News Network

1937 births
Living people
20th-century American non-fiction writers
20th-century American economists
21st-century American non-fiction writers
21st-century American economists
American male non-fiction writers
Austrian School economists
Jewish American social scientists
Jewish American writers
Mises Institute people
New York University alumni
Objectivism scholars
Objectivists
20th-century American male writers
21st-century American male writers